Scream for Help is a soundtrack album by John Paul Jones, released by Atlantic Records on 22 March 1985 to accompany the film Scream for Help. Following the Death Wish II album project, guitarist Jimmy Page was asked by his Berkshire neighbour, movie director Michael Winner, to record a soundtrack for the film Scream for Help in August 1984. Due to other commitments by Page, he instead suggested to Winner that Jones, who had just completed upgrading his 24-track digital recording studio at Devon, was best placed to write and record the soundtrack. In return, Jones asked Page to help record two tracks "Crackback" and "Spaghetti Junction".

The musical score differs in style from the Death Wish pentalogy of films, with Winner requesting that a minimum 70 piece orchestra backing be used for the soundtrack in addition to Jones' rock arrangements. Besides Page, folk guitarist John Renbourn assists on guitar, and Yes singer Jon Anderson sessioned on vocals as well as Madeline Bell, for whom Jones had previous produced, composed, recorded, and played all the instruments for her solo album Comin' Atcha in December 1973. Jones sings lead vocals on "When You Fall in Love". Jacinda Baldwin (aka Jacinda Jones), Jones' daughter is co-writer on two tracks. It was his first full-length album release since the break-up of Led Zeppelin.

The vinyl soundtrack had been unavailable in the US and UK for many years and was only obtainable on special import from Japan. The album has since been released on CD format in 2000 by WEA International.

Track listing 

2000 Compact disc edition
Same track listing and order as the vinyl release.

Personnel 
 John Paul Jones – Keyboards, synthesizer, bass guitar, guitars, backing vocals, producer, lead vocals on "When You Fall In Love" and "Bad Child"
 Jimmy Page – Electric guitars (Tracks 1 & 4)
 Jon Anderson – Vocals (Tracks 3 & 7)
 Madeline Bell – Vocals (Tracks 6 & 9)
 John Renbourn – Acoustic guitars
 Graham Ward – Drums and percussion
 Colin Green – Backing vocals
 Royal Philharmonic Orchestra – Orchestra
 The Johnny Pearson Studio Orchestra – Orchestra
 Howard Blake – Conductor
 Johnny Pearson – Conductor
 Robin Clarke – Mixing

Additional notes 
Catalogue: Atlantic Records 7 80190 1

Co-writer on "Here I Am" is Simon Bell, then backing singer for Madeline Bell before his more famous association with Dusty Springfield

Singles 
"Here I Am" was recorded but left off the first-release vinyl soundtrack album. It features as the A-side of the promo single, backed with "Christie". Released as a promotional single in the UK only.

References 

1985 debut albums
1985 soundtrack albums
Atlantic Records soundtracks
John Paul Jones (musician) albums
Horror film soundtracks